Horton is a village on the Cotswold Edge, in Gloucestershire, England. It is a linear settlement built on the slopes of a steep hill.

The name Horton is a common one in England. It normally derives from Old English horu 'dirt' and tūn 'settlement, farm, estate', presumably meaning 'farm on muddy soil', but the historical forms of this Horton vary, including the Domesday Horedone, Hortune from 1167, and the 1291 form Heorton, the latter of which could point to Old English heort 'stag'.

Horton Court is a manor house, now in the ownership of the National Trust and is a Grade I listed building. The estate is reputed to have at one time been owned by one of King Harold's sons. The oldest part of the house was built as a rectory by Robert de Beaufeu, who was rector of Horton and prebendary of Salisbury. The Norman doorways and windows have rounded arches and the roof is arch-braced and dates to the fourteenth century. It is one of the oldest houses in the country, with parts of the great hall and north wing dating from 1140, with further additions to the north wing added in the fourteenth, fifteenth and eighteenth centuries. The rest of the house was built in 1521 for Willian Knight, who was later the Bishop of Bath and Wells. The house has an L-shaped plan and is constructed of stone with a stone slate roof.

The Anglican church of St James the Elder is also a Grade I listed building, originally built in the twelfth century and rebuilt in the fourteenth century, with alterations in the fifteenth and sixteenth centuries and restorations in 1865.

References

External links

Villages in South Gloucestershire District
Civil parishes in Gloucestershire